Ocrisiodes turkmeniensis is a species of snout moth in the genus Ocrisiodes. It was described by Jan Asselbergs in 2004 and is known from Turkmenistan.

References

Moths described in 2004
Phycitinae